The Legend and the Hero 2 is a Chinese television series adapted from the novel Fengshen Yanyi (also known as Investiture of the Gods or Creation of the Gods) written by Xu Zhonglin and Lu Xixing. The series was first broadcast on TTV from September to October 2009, and was preceded by The Legend and the Hero in 2007.

Cast
 Victor Huang as King Wu of Zhou
 Ray Lui as King Zhou of Shang
 Ruby Lin as Daji
 Liu Dekai as Jiang Ziya
 Miao Haizhong as Shen Gongbao
 Ix Shen as Huang Feihu
 Bonnie Xian as Nezha
 Han Dong as Yang Jian
 Wang Like as Ziyu
 Yan Boya as Fenglai
 Tang Guoqiang as Yuanshi Tianzun
 Yang Long as Huang Tianhua
 Du Zhiguo as Su Hu
 Ding Ting as Jinzha
 Yang Chen as Muzha
 Qi Fang as Deng Chanyu
 Cheng Yalin as Tuxingsun
 Lou Qi as Wu Ji
 Yang Bo as Huang Tianxiang
 Yao Yunshun as Tongtian Jiaozhu
 Mou Fengbin as Kong Xuan
 Li Zixuan as Leizhenzi
 Li Xinling as Guanghan Fairy
 Lu Yujie as Princess Longji
 Pierre Png as Hong Jin
 Huang Jingjun as Guangchengzi
 Li Jun as Chijingzi
 Xu Jingyi as Juliusun
 Zhu Jiazhen as Yang Ren
 Xie Jiaqi as Zheng Lun
 He Lei as Yunzhongzi
 Xu Jiamin as Taishang Laojun
 Chi Sheze as Immortal Puxian
 Luo Shunming as Taoist Zhunti
 Luo Yongheng as Immortal Taiyi
 Wu Lihua as Qingxu Daode
 Sun Wanqing as Taoist Jieyin
 Guo Ye as Immortal Cihang
 Li Jianchang as Immortal Huanglong
 Jiao Changdao as Immortal Jinguang
 Wu Xiangqi as Holy Mother of Golden Spirit
 Chen Qiufang as Holy Mother of Wudang
 Yu Yang as Immortal Kunlu
 Jiang Bozhou as Wei Hu
 Zhu Yanfei as Nangong Shi
 Xie Lin as Master Yiqi
 Zhang Jiajun as Taoist Duobao
 Cheng Lidong as Wenshu Chufa

Music
 Opening theme: Ai (愛) performed by Fan Zhuqing and Wang Yingzi
 Ending themes:	
 Fengshen Bang (封神榜) performed by Zhou Peng
 Yishi Qing (一世情) performed by Chen Guoning

See also
 Gods of Honour
 The Legend and the Hero

External links
  The Legend and the Hero 2 on Sina.com
  The Legend and the Hero 2 on TTV's website

2009 Chinese television series debuts
2009 Chinese television series endings
Television shows based on Investiture of the Gods